"So Tell Me Why" is a single by American hard rock band Poison, from their 1991 Swallow This Live album. The song peaked at number 25 on the UK Singles chart

Background
The song was one of four new studio tracks on the live hits album, the others being "Only Time Will Tell", "'No More Lookin' Back (Poison Jazz)" and "Souls On Fire". This was the last single with C.C. DeVille until 2000's Power to the People.

Swallow This Live was certified Gold.

Albums
"So Tell Me Why" is on the following albums.

 Swallow This Live
 Poison's Greatest Hits: 1986-1996
 Poison - Box Set (Collector's Edition)
 Double Dose: Ultimate Hits

Chart performance

References

1991 singles
Poison (American band) songs
1991 songs
Songs written by C.C. DeVille
Songs written by Bret Michaels
Songs written by Rikki Rockett
Songs written by Bobby Dall
Capitol Records singles